Sergei Vinnitskiy (born 20 October 1975) is a former Russian football player.

References

1975 births
Living people
Russian footballers
FC Kuban Krasnodar players
Russian Premier League players
Association football defenders